Jacques Cossette (born June 20, 1954) is a Canadian retired ice hockey right winger. He played for the Pittsburgh Penguins of the NHL.

Born in Rouyn, Quebec, Cossete had a highly productive junior career, twice being named to the Quebec Major Junior Hockey League All-Star Team. Cossete's final year of junior, which was spent with the Sorel Black Hawks, saw him score 97 goals and 214 points.

Cossette was a second round selection of the Pittsburgh Penguins with whom he made his NHL debut during the 1975-76 season. 
Cossette played just 7 games with the Penguins but was able to register two assists in that time. He spent the entire 1976-77 season back in the minors with the Hershey Bears but he returned to the Penguins lineup during the 1977-78 season.

Jacques Cossette played 19 games with Pittsburgh and scored his first NHL goal that year while he also added two assists. In 1978-79 Cosette played 38 games and scored 7 goals and 9 points.

His final season came in 1979-80 when he played 78 games with the Syracuse Firebirds and scored 25 goals.

Career statistics

External links

1954 births
Living people
Binghamton Dusters players
Canadian ice hockey right wingers
Hershey Bears players
Ice hockey people from Quebec
Montreal Junior Canadiens players
Pittsburgh Penguins draft picks
Pittsburgh Penguins players
Sportspeople from Rouyn-Noranda
Syracuse Firebirds players
Vancouver Blazers draft picks